Reginald Clarke Wilks (2 April 1897 – 25 September 1953) was an Australian rules footballer who played with St Kilda in the Victorian Football League (VFL) in the summer of 1901. He was married to Gertrude Martha Wilks. He later worked as the hotel keeper at the Brittania Hotel in South Melbourne. In early 1916, he was enlisted as an ANZAC where he was assigned to the 16th Regiment, 21st Battalion. However he was discharged later that year for being medically unfit due to rheumatism. His medical records specify his condition first began in 1901, likely the reason for his football career being so brief.

References

External links 

1897 births
Australian rules footballers from Melbourne
St Kilda Football Club players
Australian military personnel of World War I
1953 deaths
People from St Kilda, Victoria